Viesca is one of the 38 municipalities of Coahuila, in north-eastern Mexico. The municipal seat lies at Viesca. The municipality covers an area of 4203.5 km².

, the municipality had a total population of 19,328.

References

Municipalities of Coahuila